Miss Delaware USA is the pageant that selects the representative for the state of Delaware in the Miss USA pageant, and the name of the title held by its winner. The pageant is directed by V&M Productions.

Delaware had not placed in Miss USA until 2015, where Renee Bull placed in the Top 10. This is additionally Delaware's first, most recent, and only placement.

The current Miss Delaware USA is Grace Lange of Newark and was crowned on April 3, 2022 at Laird Performing Arts Center of The Tatnall School in Wilmington. Lange represented Delaware at Miss USA 2022.

Gallery of titleholders

Results summary

Placements
Top 11: Renee Bull (2015)

Delaware has only placed once.

Awards
Miss Congeniality: Renee Bull (2015)

Winners
Color key

Notes

References

External links
 Miss Delaware USA official webpage

Delaware
Beauty pageants in Delaware
Women in Delaware
Recurring events established in 1952
Annual events in Delaware
1950s establishments in Delaware